The 1998 Mobil 1 British Rally Championship was won by Manxman Martin Rowe in the Renault Megane Maxi Kit Car ahead of veteran Welsh driver Gwyndaf Evans in the SEAT Ibiza Kit Car and Alister McRae in The Volkswagen Golf Kit Car. Reigning champion Mark Higgins had a very disappointing season in the new Nissan Almera Kit Car. The ladies' cup was won by SEAT driver Barbara Armstrong ahead of Ford's Stephanie Simmonite. The manufacturers' championship was won by Renault.

Driver Changes

1996 Champion Gwyndaf Evans moved from Ford to SEAT

Robbie Head was replaced at Renault by Tapio Laukkanen who had moved from Volkswagen

Head in turn joined SEAT

Vauxhall returned to the series with the Astra Kit Car with Jarmo Kytolehto at the wheel

Harri Rovanpera did not compete in The British Championship this season to concentrate on his WRC Commitments with SEAT

Calendar

Teams and Drivers 

'Drivers Championship'

Manufacturers Championship

There was an earlier round before the Vauxhall Rally of Wales, the Silverstone RallySprint which only counted for manufacturers points

References

External links
 Duke Video, Isle of Man 1998 British Rally Championship Review
 http://www.rallybase.nl/index.php?type=result&rallyid=2506
 http://www.motorsport.com/#!/brc/news/gwyndaf-evans-rally-of-wales-preview/
 http://www.motorsport.com/#!/brc/news/rally-of-wales-seat-review/
 http://www.motorsport.com/#!/brc/news/manx-int-l-rally-final-results
 http://www.motorsport.com/#!/brc/news/manx-int-l-rally-ford-review
 http://archive.djames.org.uk/1998/mobil.html
 http://archive.djames.org.uk/1998/manx/mobil.html

British Rally Championship seasons
Rally Championship
British Rally Championship